Antalya Fm, since 1994 has been published in the FM band in Antalya. Publishes only folk music and ethnic music.

External links
Antalya Fm resmi website

Radio stations in Turkey
Radio in Turkey
Mass media in Antalya
Radio stations established in 1994
1994 establishments in Turkey